parts 
Cyperus laeteflorens is a species of sedge that is native to parts of the New Caledonia.

See also 
 List of Cyperus species

References 

laeteflorens
Plants described in 1931
Flora of New Caledonia
Taxa named by Georg Kükenthal